Union Township, Illinois may refer to one of the following townships:

 Union Township, Cumberland County, Illinois
 Union Township, Effingham County, Illinois
 Union Township, Fulton County, Illinois
 Union Township, Livingston County, Illinois

There is also:

 Union Grove Township, Whiteside County, Illinois

See also

 Union Township (disambiguation)

Illinois township disambiguation pages